Elic or ELIC may refer to:

Elic, Kentucky, an unincorporated community in Knott County
Executive Life Insurance Company